This is a list of the 320 members of the 14th legislature of the Italian Senate that were elected in the 2001 general election. The legislature met from 30 May 2001 to 27 April 2006.

Senators for life are marked with a "(L)"

Forza Italia

Democrats of the Left

National Alliance

Democracy is Freedom - The Daisy

Whiteflower

Christian Democratic Centre

United Christian Democrats

Lega Nord

Federation of the Greens
Stefano Boco
Francesco Carella
Fiorello Cortiana
Loredana De Petris
Anna Donati
Francesco Martone
Angelo Muzio
Natale Ripamonti
Sauro Turroni
Giampaolo Zancan

Per le Autonomie
Gianni Agnelli (L)
Giulio Andreotti (L)
Mauro Betta
Renzo Michelini

South Tyrolean People's Party
Helga Thaler Ausserhofer
Alois Kofler
Oskar Peterlini

Valdostan Union
Augusto Rollandin

European Democracy
Giuseppe Ruvolo
Francesco Salzano

Mixed group

Italian Democratic Socialists
Cesare Marini
Tommaso Casillo
Giovanni Crema
Ottaviano Del Turco
Gerardo Labellarte
Maria Rosaria Manieri

Communist Refoundation Party
Luigi Malabarba
Giorgio Malentacchi
Tommaso Sodano
Livio Togni

Party of Italian Communists
Luigi Marino
Gianfranco Pagliarulo

League for Lombard Autonomy
Elidio De Paoli

New Italian Socialist Party
Francesco Antonio Crinò

Italian Republican Party
Antonio Del Pennino

Tricolour Flame
Luigi Caruso

Movimento Territorio Lombardo
Valerio Carrara

Libertà e Giustizia per l'Ulivo
Achille Occhetto

Independents
Giuliano Amato
Francesco Cossiga (L)
Giovanni Leone (L)
Oscar Luigi Scalfaro (L)
Sergio Zavoli
Sergio Pininfarina (L)

References

Lists of political office-holders in Italy
Lists of legislators by term
Lists of members of upper houses